Tim's may refer to:

Tim Hortons, Canadian fast food chain
Tim's Cascade Snacks, an American brand

See also
Cherwell Boathouse, a restaurant and boat storage facility in Oxford, England, once known as Tims's